The Bulletin de la Société de Linguistique de Paris (abbr. BSL or BSLP) is an academic journal published by the Société de Linguistique de Paris since 1869.

The journal
Published annually, the journal contains two separate volumes: one of articles, and one dedicated to the review of books recently published in linguistics.

The journal's coverage includes most traditional subdisciplines within linguistics: historical linguistics (with a strong tradition of Indo-European studies and comparative grammar, but also studies of other families); linguistic typology; theoretical and descriptive linguistics; history of linguistics; natural language processing; language acquisition, and so forth.

Related series
 Mémoires de la Société de Linguistique de Paris (list of publications)
 Collection linguistique de la Société de Linguistique de Paris (list of publications)

External links
 Journal online
 Publisher's site
 Digitized versions of the first 37 volumes of the BSLP, 1869-1940 (site of Gallica, Bibliothèque nationale de France)

Linguistics journals
French-language journals
French-language literature
Publications established in 1869
1869 establishments in France